Derwent Park is a major sports complex in northern England. 

There are other places around the world called Derwent Park. These include:

Derwent Park, Tasmania - a suburb of Hobart
Derwent Park (Rowlands Gill), a park in Tyne and Wear, England